The South African Railways Class 1 4-8-0 of 1904 was a steam locomotive from the pre-Union era in the Colony of Natal.

In 1904, the Natal Government Railways placed fifty Class B  Mastodon type steam locomotives in service. Six of them were modified to a 4-8-2 Mountain type wheel arrangement in 1906. In 1912, when the remaining 44  locomotives were assimilated into the South African Railways, they were renumbered and designated .

Design
Because of the limited coal and water range of the existing fleet of Natal Government Railways (NGR) tank locomotives as well as the necessity to double- and even triple-head over the worst sections of the mainline, NGR Locomotive Superintendent D.A. Hendrie was tasked to produce a locomotive of greater power and capable of longer distances without refuelling or rewatering to work the mainline's steep 1 in 30 (3%) gradients.

His resulting Class B achieved this, being more powerful and with a longer range. When the designs were completed, Hendrie proposed that only five locomotives should be ordered so that they may first be thoroughly tested in service before ordering more. The designs, however, were so well received that the NGR placed an immediate order for fifty locomotives with the North British Locomotive Company (NBL).

Manufacturer

It does appear as though there was a fair degree of urgency to obtain these locomotives, evidenced on the one hand by the rush to place a large order for an untested locomotive and on the other hand by the fact that construction was accelerated by dividing it equally between NBL's Hyde Park and Queens Park works. The NGR's faith in Hendrie's ability turned out to be well justified, however, considering the fact that some of these locomotives remained in service for over seventy years.

Delivered in 1904, the Class B  Mastodon type was the first tender locomotive to be placed in service by the NGR apart from the single home-built  engine Havelock of 1888. Fifty were built, those numbered in the range from 275 to 299 at the NBL Hyde Park works and those numbered in the range from 300 to 324 at the NBL Queens Park works.

The type SH tender was introduced along with these locomotives. It rode on two-axle bogies and had a capacity of  coal and  water.

Characteristics

Combustion chamber
Even though the boiler was not pitched very high, Hendrie had still managed to extend the Belpaire firebox sideways over the trailing coupled wheels, with the result that the grate was almost on a level with the bottom of the boiler shell. To prevent the fire from entering the lower row of tubes, Hendrie arranged a vertical firewall towards the front of the grate, which also created a dry combustion chamber.

This combustion chamber pre-dated the Gaines type, which was practically identical, by four years. The Gaines type was introduced in the United States of America in 1908 and became widely used on American locomotives.

Valve gear

Electric headlight
Shortly after engine no. 275 had run its trials on 25 October 1904, it was fitted with a Pyle National Electric headlight which consisted of a self-contained turbine and dynamo and an arc lamp, placed on top of the smokebox in front of the chimney and supported by two brackets. The headlight proved so successful that it gradually replaced the old huge oil-burning lamps, which had been in use for over fifty years, on all mainline locomotives.

Performance
Compared to the Reid Tenwheeler, the Class B was able to haul 7.5% more load and, on average, ran  more before requiring repairs.

Modifications
Six of the locomotives, those numbered in the range from 319 to 324, were modified to 4-8-2 Mountain types in 1906, but retained their Class B designation on the NGR.

Another locomotive, no. 280, was equipped with steam reversing gear in 1907, also to Hendrie's design. The steam reverser proved to be an unqualified success and was soon adopted as standard equipment on the rest of the Class. It was fitted to all engines which were subsequently designed by Hendrie and remained the standard reverser on South African steam locomotives well into the 1940s.

South African Railways
When the Union of South Africa was established on 31 May 1910, the three Colonial government railways (Cape Government Railways, NGR and Central South African Railways) were united under a single administration to control and administer the railways, ports and harbours of the Union. Although the South African Railways and Harbours came into existence in 1910, the actual classification and renumbering of all the rolling stock of the three constituent railways were only implemented with effect from 1 January 1912.

In 1912, the remaining 44 Mastodon types were renumbered in the range from 1245 to 1288 and designated  on the South African Railways (SAR).

Service
The locomotives were placed in service hauling all the fast passenger and goods trains between Durban and Pietermaritzburg and were the first locomotives to accomplish a return working of this service within a day, with the same crewmen. These locomotives opened up a new era on the NGR, where the tank locomotive was at last withdrawn 
from mainline working. Later, in SAR service, these locomotives were also used on mainline workings out of Port Elizabeth.

In their later years they were relegated to shunting, particularly working in Natal but also in Cape Town, Port Elizabeth, East London and in Transvaal. Although their gradual withdrawal from service already commenced in 1935, half of the Class were still in capital stock by March 1972, with the last one only being written off in 1975.

In industrial service, two of the locomotives survived even longer and were still in service in 1984.
 SAR no. 1252 as Randfontein Estates Gold Mine no. 4.
 SAR no. 1277 as Apex Mines no. 2 at Greenside.

Works numbers and renumbering
Their works numbers, numbering, SAR reclassification and renumbering are listed in the table.

Preservation
Only two of these engines survive.

Illustration
The main picture shows NGR Class B no. 275, later SAR Class 1 no. 1245, as delivered. The Belpaire firebox is markedly longer than usual as a result of the combustion chamber.

References

1180
1180
4-8-0 locomotives
2D locomotives
NBL locomotives
Cape gauge railway locomotives
Railway locomotives introduced in 1904
1904 in South Africa